Matthew Tucker (born May 24, 1991) is a former American football running back. He played college football at TCU. Tucker signed as an undrafted free agent with the Philadelphia Eagles in 2013.

Early years
He was selected to the first-team all-state. He was named as the Class 3A Offensive Player of the Year in high school.

Professional career

Philadelphia Eagles
On April 27, 2013, he signed with the Philadelphia Eagles as an undrafted free agent. He was released on August 30, 2014 Tucker signed with the Eagles Practice Squad on August 31, 2014. He was waived by the Eagles on July 27, 2015, a few days before the start of training camp.

New York Jets
The New York Jets signed Tucker on August 4, 2016. He was waived/injured on August 13, 2016 after not appearing in New York's first preseason game. After going unclaimed on waivers, Tucker reverted to the team's injured reserve list. Tucker reached an injury settlement with the Jets and was released from the reserve list on September 6, 2016.

References

External links
TCU bio
Philadelphia Eagles bio
New York Jets bio

1991 births
Living people
American football running backs
TCU Horned Frogs football players
Philadelphia Eagles players
New York Jets players